Romain Arneodo and Jonathan Eysseric were the defending champions but chose not to defend their title.

Franco Agamenone and Fernando Romboli won the title after defeating Facundo Argüello and Martín Cuevas 7–6(7–5), 1–6, [10–6] in the final.

Seeds

Draw

References
 Main draw

Challenger ATP Cachantún Cup - Doubles
2019 Doubles